The 2021 Pure ETCR Championship was the inaugural season of Pure ETCR, a touring car series for electric cars. It started on 18 June and featured cars from three manufacturers racing at five different locations. Swedish driver Mattias Ekström was crowned champion of the season, while Cupra won the manufacturer's championship.

Race format

Because only six cars are ready for the first season (two for each team), the twelve drivers are randomly drawn into two groups ("Pool A" and "Pool B") for each race weekend. Throughout the weekend, a driver never directly faces a driver from the other pool. Points are collected in a series of short races and the driver with the most points will be the overall winner, called "king of the weekend".

The first two rounds are short races with two or three cars (called "battles"): Round 1 consists of four battles (two per pool) of three randomly drawn drivers each. In each pool, the two winners of each round 1 battle face each other in round 2, so do the two runner-ups and the two third-place drivers, for a total of six battles of 2 cars. Points are award in both rounds.

Round 3 are time trials to determine the grid for the final. No points are awarded in this round. Round 4 are the "superfinals" where the six cars from each pool race against each other.

Teams and drivers

Three teams are participate in the first season, each developing a different car.

Calendar
The calendar for the inaugural season featuring five races across Europe and Asia was revealed in February 2021.

Results and standings

Results

Scoring system

Drivers' championship

Manufacturers' championship

References

External links
 

2021 in motorsport